Bicyclus mandanes, the large marbled bush brown, is a butterfly in the family Nymphalidae. It is found in Senegal, Guinea-Bissau, Guinea, Sierra Leone, Liberia, Ivory Coast, Ghana, Togo, southern Nigeria, Cameroon, Gabon, the Republic of the Congo, the Central African Republic, Angola, the Democratic Republic of the Congo, Uganda, western Kenya, western Tanzania and Zambia. The habitat consists of wet and dry forests.

Adults feed on fallen fruit and carnivore scats.

References

Elymniini
Butterflies described in 1873
Butterflies of Africa
Taxa named by William Chapman Hewitson